Stephen Beus (born 1981, Othello, Washington, United States) is an American pianist.

Biography
Stephen Beus began taking piano lessons at age 5, and made his symphonic debut at age 9. He won the MTNA National Competition at the high school level at age 17, and later won the same competition again at age 21 at the collegiate level. He attended nearby Whitman College for undergraduate studies, and later attended the Juilliard School of Music at the graduate level. In 2011, Stephen obtained his DMA at Stony Brooke University. His teachers have included Leonard Richter, Gilbert Kalish, Christina Dahl, Paulette Richards and Robert McDonald. Stephen and his wife have four children.

Career

Since graduating from Juilliard, Beus has maintained an active performance and competition schedule. In 2006 he won first prize in the Gina Bachauer International Piano Competition and Vendome International Piano Competition, as well as the Max I Allen Fellowship from the American Pianists Association. He competed in the XII Van Cliburn International Piano Competition in 2005, and the Thirteenth Van Cliburn International Piano Competition in 2009.

In 2006 he released his first album, Excursions: Piano Music of Barber and Bauer, on the Endeavor Classics label. His second, Stephen Beus Plays Griffes and Scriabin, was released in 2007 on Harmonia Mundi.

Stephen is currently an assistant professor in the Keyboard Division at Brigham Young University in Provo, Utah.

References

External links
Official website

1982 births
21st-century American male musicians
21st-century American pianists
21st-century classical pianists
American classical pianists
American male classical pianists
Living people
People from Othello, Washington
Prize-winners of the Gina Bachauer International Piano Competition
Whitman College alumni